Branford Edward Clarke (March 18, 1885 – July 7, 1947) was an Evangelical preacher, poet and artist who promoted the Ku Klux Klan through his art which was drawn for the Pillar of Fire Church and their publications.

Biography
He was born on March 18, 1885, in London, England. His brother was a Member of Parliament.  In the 1920s he converted a Model T into a mobile chapel. He was pastor of the Pillar of Fire Church in Brooklyn, New York, for at least several years. From about 1925 to 1928 he illustrated numerous religious and political publications for the Pillar of Fire Church in partnership with Bishop Alma White, the church's founder and leader. Many of his illustrations supported Bishop White's writings by attacking various minorities including Catholics, Jews, and US immigrants and by promoting the Ku Klux Klan.

He died on July 7, 1947, and was buried in the Pillar of Fire cemetery in Zarephath, New Jersey. His epitaph reads "The Cross he bore, through years of service bound, on yonder shore in recompense is found, The Crown."

Artwork

Books
Poems and Pictures by a Preacher (1921) 
The Ku Klux Klan In Prophecy (1925)
Klansmen: Guardians of Liberty (1926)
Heroes of the Fiery Cross (1928)
Woman's Chains (1943):  9 illustrations
Guardians of Liberty Vol I-III, (1943)

Periodicals
The Good Citizen (1913–1933)

Hymns
Several of Clarke's poems were set to music by his wife Esther and published as hymns in the Pillar of Fire's Cross and Crown Hymnal. Some of Branford Clarke's hymns include:  Tell Me of the Love of Jesus, Everything Will Work Out Right, God Keep Me Strong, Prayer Changes Things, Calling Again and Again, Take Heart, and Yonder Shore.

Yonder Shore
Life may have clouds, but when I think of Jesus
The sun breaks thro' its radiance to outpour
And far away I hear the song of angels
Singing, singing, singing on yonder shore.

There is a cross that every one must carry
Long a thorned path whose toils will soon be o'er
Then at His feet shall we lay down our burdens
With the fair immortals on yonder shore.

While trav'ling on to that eternal haven
Here in the heart can be fair Canaan's door
Thro' which the love of Jesus softly stealing
Fills the soul with glory from yonder shore.

There is a death, but it is only mortal
The soul lives on and on for evermore.
How wonderful to dwell for aye with Jesus
Ever and forever on yonder shore.

Chorus
Singing on that shore
Singing on that shore
Hark, I hear them singing
Singing, ever, singing on yonder shore.

Images

References

Further reading
Christianizing the Klan:  Alma White, Branford Clarke, and the Art of Religious Intolerance June 2009 by Lynn S. Neal  Church History June 2009

External links

Branford Clarke at Flickr

American Ku Klux Klan members
Pillar of Fire International
1885 births
1947 deaths
American pamphleteers
American male non-fiction writers
English emigrants to the United States
Critics of the Catholic Church
American temperance activists
American cartoonists